The following highways are numbered 786:

Canada

United States